Oconomowoc Area School District is a school district headquartered in Oconomowoc, Wisconsin. , the district has 5,300 students.

History
The current (as of 2021) district superintendent is Kristen Taylor, superseding Roger Rindo, who served from July 2013 until 2021. Rindo left to take the superintendent in the Reedsburg School District.

In 2021, three board members resigned, citing the tense atmosphere in regards to COVID-19-related disputes.

Service area
Within Waukesha County it serves: Oconomowoc, Oconomowoc Lake, the county's portion of Lac La Belle, most of Summit, and most of Okauchee Lake.

Within Jefferson County it serves Ixonia and that county's section of Lac La Belle.

Within Dodge County it serves Ashippun.

Schools
 High schools
 Oconomowoc High School

 Intermediate schools
 Nature Hill Intermediate School
 Silver Lake Intermediate School

 Elementary schools
 Greenland Elementary School
 Ixonia Elementary School
 Meadow View Elementary School
 Park Lawn Elementary School
 Summit Elementary School

 Virtual
 OCON Virtual Learning Community

References

External links
 Oconomowoc Area School District (oasd.k12.wi.us)
 Oconomowoc Area School District (oasd.org)

School districts in Wisconsin
Education in Dodge County, Wisconsin
Education in Jefferson County, Wisconsin
Education in Waukesha County, Wisconsin